William Louis "Gabe" Gabler (August 4, 1930 – January 4, 2014) was an American professional baseball first baseman who appeared in three games in Major League Baseball (MLB) for the Chicago Cubs in . Appearing exclusively as a pinch hitter for the Cubs, he struck out three times in three at bats.

Gabler attended Central High School in St. Louis. His 11-season pro career began in 1950, when he signed with the Brooklyn Dodgers as an amateur free agent. He played in the Dodgers' farm system through 1955, and eventually was acquired by Cubs the following year after he bounced around two other MLB organizations. Gabler was a power hitter in the minor leagues, posting double-digit home run totals in all 11 seasons in which he played. In 1961—Gabler's last year as an active player—his 30 home runs led the Double-A Southern Association.

During Gabler's only MLB trial, in September 1958, he fanned against the Philadelphia Phillies' Don Erickson (on the 16th), then against Los Angeles Dodgers' Ralph Mauriello (on the 19th) and Johnny Klippstein (on the 21st).

Gabler died in St. Louis in 2014.

References

External links 

1930 births
2014 deaths
Atlanta Crackers players
Baseball players from St. Louis
Chicago Cubs players
Elmira Pioneers players
Fort Worth Cats players
Hollywood Stars players
Macon Peaches players
Memphis Chickasaws players
Miami Sun Sox players
Minneapolis Millers (baseball) players
Newport News Dodgers players
Santa Barbara Dodgers players
Tulsa Oilers (baseball) players